Corn Uí Riada is the premier sean-nós singing competition at Oireachtas na Gaeilge, an annually held arts festival of Irish culture. It is named in honour of the composer and founder of the legendary male choir Cór Chúil Aodha, Seán Ó Riada. A Cóisir Uí Riada is held whilst tuning into the broadcast of Corn Uí Riada, on the internet.

Past winners

1972 Treasa Ní Mhiolláin
1973 Nan Ghrialais
1974 Áine Ní Dhonnacha
1975 Joe John Mac An Iomaire
1976 Micheál Seoighe
1977 Joe John Mac An Iomaire
1978 Josie Sheáin Jeaic Mac Donncha
1979 Treasa Ní Mhiolláin
1980 Tomás Ó Neachtain
1981 Tomás Ó Neachtain
1982 Josie Sheáin Jeaic Mac Donncha
1983 Máirtín Tom Sheáinín Mac Donnacha
1984 Sarah Ghriallais
1985 Johnny Mháirtín Learaí Mac Donnchadha
1986 Máirín Uí Chéide
1987 Nora Bn Mhic Dhonnacha
1988 Máirtín Tom Sheáinín Mac Donnacha
1989 Nora Bn Mhic Dhonnacha
1990 Áine Uí Cheallaigh
1991 Liam Lillis Ó Laoire
1992 Áine Uí Cheallaigh
1993 Nora Bn Mhic Dhonnacha
1994 Liam Lillis Ó Laoire
1995 Mairéad Ní Oistín
1996 Gearoidín Bhreathnach
1997 Éamon Ó Donnchadha
1998 Nan Tom Taimín de Búrca
1999 Celia Uí Bheinéad (Celia Ní Fhátharta)
2000 Nan Tom Taimín de Búrca
2001 Meaití Jo Sheamuis Ó Fátharta
2002 Bríd Ní Mhaoilchiaráin
2003 Éamon Ó Donnchadha
2004 Gearoidín Bhreathnach
2005 Éamon Ó Donnchadha
2006 Stiofán Ó Cualáin
2007 Micheál Ó Confhaola
2008 Ciarán Ó Con Cheanainn
2009 Doimnic Mac Giolla Bhríde
2010 Nollaig Ní Laoire
2011 Jimmy Ó Ceannabháin
2012 Pól Ó Ceannabháin
2013 Micheál Ó Confhaola
2014 Nell Ní Chróinín
2015  Bríd Ní Mhaoilchiaráin
2016  Caitlín Ní Chualáin
2017  Conchubhar Ó Luasa
2018  Máire Ní Chéileachair
2019  Máire Ní Choilm
2022  Bríd Ní Mhaoilchiaráin

References

External links
Official website

Irish language
Cultural festivals in Ireland
Sean-nós singers

fi:Oireachtas na Samhna